Brian Easton may refer to:

 Brian Easton (economist) (born 1943), New Zealand economist
 Brian Easton (footballer) (born 1988), Scottish footballer